Kozogawa Dam  is a gravity dam located in Ibaraki Prefecture in Japan. The dam is used for water supply. The catchment area of the dam is 0.3 km2. The dam impounds about 20  ha of land when full and can store 1970 thousand cubic meters of water. The construction of the dam was started on 1980 and completed in 1985.

See also
List of dams in Japan

References

Dams in Ibaraki Prefecture